Bryotropha tachyptilella is a moth of the family Gelechiidae. It is found in Slovakia, Hungary, Romania, Bulgaria, Greece, Turkey and Ukraine.

The wingspan is 14–15 mm. The forewings are dark ochreous grey, in the central part mixed with pale ochreous and ochreous grey. The hindwings are pale ochreous brown, but darker towards the apex. Adults have been recorded on wing from May to July and in early September.

References

Moths described in 1916
tachyptilella
Moths of Europe